Ilkhchi (also Romanized as Īlkhchī; also known as Qeshlāq-e Īlkhchī, Īlkhchīh-ye Bālā, and Vilkhidje) is a village in Angut-e Gharbi Rural District, Anguti District, Germi County, Ardabil Province, Iran. At the 2006 census, its population was 296, in 59 families.

References 

Tageo

Towns and villages in Germi County